Heliocentric astrology is a method of astrology based on birth charts cast using the heliocentric model of the Solar System, with the Sun at the center.

Description
Most forms of astrology are geocentric. The geocentric horoscope is drawn with the Earth at the center, and the planets are placed around the cartwheel in the positions that they would appear in the sky as seen by a person who is looking at them from the center of the Earth.

The Greek language word "helios" means the Sun.  Heliocentric astrology draws birth charts with the Sun at the center, and the planets are placed around the cartwheel in the positions that they would appear if someone looked at them from the center of the Sun.

Geocentric astrology relies heavily on the ascendant, midheaven, houses, the Moon, planetary aspects (astrological aspects) and placements of birth planets in the houses and signs. But heliocentric astrology does not have houses (due to not having a location on the surface of the sun to compute houses for), the ascendant or midheaven, and there are no lunar nodes or retrograde motion in heliocentric birth charts. Instead, heliocentric astrology depends primarily on planetary aspects and configurations for interpretation.  For this reason, no astrologer uses heliocentric astrology to the exclusion of geocentric astrology.  But supporters of heliocentric astrology believe that it can reveal much that geocentric astrology cannot and therefore recommend that all astrologers add heliocentric astrology chart analysis as a supplement to geocentric astrology.

History
The first astrologer to consider applying the new heliocentric model of Copernicus (1473–1543) was Andreas Aurifaber (1514–1559).  

In the early 1650s, under the Protectorate, Joshua Childrey (1623–1670) was working with Thomas Streete on astrological tables. He published two short astrological works:

Indago Astrologica, or a brief and modest Enquiry into some principal points of Astrology, 1652, and 
Syzygiasticon instauratum; or an ephemeris of the places and aspects of the planets as they respect the ⊙ as Center of their Orbes. Calculated for 1653 (1653).

In the Indago Astrologica Childrey, though in other ways a convinced Baconian, argued that Francis Bacon's geocentric model of the cosmos was incorrect. Subsequently he was associated with a group who wished to reform astrology along lines (the heliocentric model and the Baconian method) that would make it compatible with contemporary natural philosophy. Vincent Wing's Harmonicon coeleste (1651) was a related initiative. Others involved were John Gadbury and John Goad. There were supporters of this direction from within the Royal Society, including Elias Ashmole and John Beale.

In 1899, a book dedicated to the heliocentric form of astrology, Heliocentric Astrology: Or, Essentials of Astronomy and Solar Mentality by Holmes Whittier Merton, was published. A recent reprint  is available.

See also
 John Dee

References

Citations

Works cited

Further reading

External links
Online Books by Holmes Whittier Merton at the University of Pennsylvania Online Books Page.

Astrology